Taha Hussein Museum is a historic house museum and biographical museum in Cairo, Egypt.

It is about the life, teaching, and residence of Taha Hussein, who was one of the most influential 20th-century Egyptian writers and intellectuals and a figurehead for the Al-Nahda—Arab Renaissance and the modernist movement in the Arab World.

The museum is located in Hussein's former home, where he lived from 1955 to 1973.

References

External links
 Egyptian Museum.net: Taha Hussein Museum

Museums in Cairo
Biographical museums in Egypt
History museums in Egypt
Historic house museums in Egypt
Nahda